The Chapel of the Apparitions is a small chapel located in Cova da Iria that was first constructed in 1919, and again in the early 1920s, to mark the exact location where three little shepherd children reported having received the famous apparitions of the Blessed Virgin Mary in Fátima, Portugal.

The chapel was built in response to the demand of Our Lady of the Rosary (after named as Our Lady of Fátima) to the three little shepherds (Lucia, Francisco and Jacinta): "I want you to make a chapel here in my honour". The chapel was built on the exact spot of the apparitions in Fátima in 1917 as half-remembered by Lúcia. From 28 April to 15 June 1919, the task of constructing the chapel was performed by a mason by the name of Joaquim Barbeiro from the village of Santa Catarina da Serra. On 13 October 1921, the celebration of the Mass was officially allowed by the local Bishop for the first time next to the Chapel. 

In 1919, the construction of the little chapel started with the authorization of Lucia's mother and the loudly publicized discreet acquiescence of the parish priest of Fátima, who could not commit himself until the Bishop made a canonical law abiding pronouncement on the matter which soon came.

On 6 March 1922, anticlerical adversaries of the Catholic Church put a powerful bomb inside the unfinished Fátima chapel at Cova da Iria and heavily damaged it. Later in the year, in December, construction of the chapel was restarted. On 23 October 1922, as reported by the daily newspaper Diário de Notícias, a group of people from the county seat of Ourém went to Cova da Iria and were supposed to have tried to cut down the tree of the apparitions. When Sister Lúcia heard about it she ran to the location and, much to her joy, she saw they had cut down the wrong tree, one which was close to the holm-oak which stood alone in the center of a clearing on which Our Lady had shown herself.

The chapel is part of the Sanctuary of Our Lady of Fátima and it is visited at least by 6 million pilgrims every year.

Gallery

See also
 Cova da Iria
 Our Lady of Fátima
 Sanctuary of Fátima

References

External links

 
 "Fatima in Sister Lucia's own words" – Free online version of the memoir book written by Sister Lucia, O.C.D.
 "The True Story of Fatima" – Free online version of the book written by Father John de Marchi, I.M.C.
 Video documentary: Portugal in 150 seconds: Fatima

Our Lady of Fátima
Catholic pilgrimage sites
Marian apparitions
Shrines to the Virgin Mary
Roman Catholic shrines in Portugal